You Can Take What's Mine, is the second extended play from Brisbane band George and first non-self-released EP.. The EP was released in 1999.

The CD-ROM component has footage of the band answering some questions. An extended version of "Spawn" appears on their debut studio album, Polyserena.

Track listing
 "Spawn"	
 "Polyserena"	
 "Nothing"	
 "G.S.T."	
 "To The Void"	
 "Cry" (Krus D & Carlos F Remix)

Weekly charts

References

1999 EPs
George (band) albums